The  was a train service operated by Japanese National Railways (JNR) in Japan between 1982 and 1985.

The Shinkansen Relay was therefore provided to shuttle passengers between Ueno and Ōmiya via the narrow gauge Tohoku Main Line. Initially, 13 down and 14 up services operated daily, taking 26 minutes for the non-stop journey. From November 1982, the frequency was increased to 28 down and 29 up services daily, running at 30-minute intervals during the daytime off-peak. Services consisted of pairs of 7-car 185-200 series EMUs, providing a total seating capacity of 848. One Shinkansen Relay service served a pair of Tohoku Shinkansen and Joetsu Shinkansen services. Express 455 series and suburban 115 series EMUs were also used on some trains.

The Shinkansen Relay service ended on 13 March 1985, the day before the Tohoku Shinkansen opened between Ueno and Ōmiya. The 185-200 series EMUs were reassigned for use on other Limited express services such as the Kusatsu.

Rapid Shinkansen Relay (1998–2001)

Services were introduced in 1997 as the Komachi Relay before becoming the Shinkansen Relay, and were formed of 6-car 165 and 169 series EMU formations. The services were renamed Musashino from 2001.

Rapid Shinkansen Relay (April 2011)

Trains were operated using 485 series, 583 series, and E721 series EMUs, with all seats non-reserved.

References

Shinkansen
East Japan Railway Company
Named passenger trains of Japan
Railway services introduced in 1982